Santa Ana or Santa Anna may refer to:

People
 Saint Anne, mother of the Virgin Mary
 Ingegerd Olofsdotter of Sweden or St. Anna (c. 1001–1050), daughter of Olaf, King of Sweden
 Benito Fernández de Santa Ana (1707–1761), Spanish missionary in Texas
 Muriel Santa Ana (born 1968), Argentine actress
 Antonio López de Santa Anna (1794–1876), Mexican general and politician

Places

Argentina
 Santa Ana, Jujuy
 Santa Ana, Misiones
 Santa Ana, Santa Fe

Bolivia
 Santa Ana del Yacuma
 Santa Ana de Velasco

Cape Verde
 Santa Ana, Cape Verde

Colombia
 Santa Ana, Magdalena

Costa Rica
 Santa Ana Canton
 Santa Ana, Costa Rica

Ecuador
 Santa Ana (La Florida), an archaeological site
 Santa Ana Hill, Guayaquil

El Salvador
 Santa Ana Department
 Santa Ana, El Salvador
 Santa Ana Volcano

Honduras
 Santa Ana, La Paz
 Santa Ana, Francisco Morazán

Mexico
 
 Santa Ana, Oaxaca
 Santa Ana, Sonora
 Santa Ana Ateixtlahuaca
 Santa Ana Cuauhtémoc
 Santa Ana de Guadalupe; see San José de los Reynoso
 Santa Ana del Valle
 Santa Ana Tavela
 Santa Ana Tlapacoyan
 Santa Ana Yareni
 Santa Ana Zegache

Panama
 Santa Ana, Los Santos
 Santa Ana, Panama City

Papua New Guinea
 St. Anna (mission station), a Roman Catholic mission station during the German colonial period in New Guinea

Paraguay
 Santa Ana (Asunción), a barrio of Asunción

Peru
 Santa Ana District, Castrovirreyna
 Santa Ana District, La Convención

Philippines
 Santa Ana, Cagayan
 Santa Ana, Manila
 Santa Ana, Pampanga
 Santa Ana, Taguig

Solomon Islands
 Santa Ana (Solomon Islands), now known as Owaraha

Spain
 Santa Ana, Cáceres
 Santa Ana, Zamora
 Santa Ana de Pusa, Toledo

United States
 Santa Ana, California
 Santa Ana (Amtrak station), a train station in Santa Ana
 Santa Ana Canyon, a canyon near Santa Ana
 Santa Ana Freeway, a major freeway from Los Angeles to Santa Ana
 Santa Ana Mountains, a short mountain range near Santa Ana
 Santa Ana River, the largest river in Southern California, flows through Santa Ana
 Santa Ana Pueblo, New Mexico
 St. Anna, Wisconsin

Uruguay
 Santa Ana, Canelones
 Santa Ana, Colonia

Venezuela
 Santa Ana, Anzoátegui, in Anzoátegui
 Santa Ana de Coro
 Santa Ana, Nueva Esparta

Ships
 Spanish ship Santa Ana (1784), a Spanish ship taken by the British in the Battle of Trafalgar in 1805
 Svyataya Anna (St Anna), a Russian brig that disappeared in the Arctic in 1914
 Santa Anna, a Manila galleon captured and sunk by Thomas Cavendish in 1587

Music
 "Santianna" (a.k.a. "Santa Ana"), a traditional sea-shanty (folk song)
 "Santa Ana", a 1973 song by Bruce Springsteen released in 1998 on the 4 disc-box set Tracks
 "Santa Ana", a tune recorded by British instrumental group The Shadows on their 1964 album The Sound of The Shadows

Other uses
 Santa Ana Church, Amazonas, Peru
 Santa Ana Drags, the first drag strip in the United States
 Santa Ana Line, a former train route in California, U.S.
 Santa Ana metro station, in Santiago, Chile
 Santa Ana River, a river in southern California, United States
 Santa Ana winds, strong seasonal winds in Southern California, United States, and northern Baja California, Mexico
 Owa language, a language of the Solomon Islands formerly called Santa Ana

See also
 Santana (disambiguation)
 Santa Ana winds (disambiguation)
 Saint Anne (disambiguation)
 Sainte-Anne (disambiguation)
 St Ann's (disambiguation)
 St Anne's (disambiguation)
 Anna (disambiguation)
 Fort Sainte Anne (disambiguation)
 Sant'Anna (disambiguation)
 Santa Anna (disambiguation)
 Santa Anita (disambiguation)